The Great Oolite Group is a Middle Jurassic stratigraphic unit that outcrops in southern England. It consists of a complex set of marine deposits primarily mudstone and bioclastic ooidal and fine grained limestone, deposited in nearshore to shelf settings.  It is exposed at the surface as a variably thick belt extending roughly NE-SW from the coast of Dorset up to the Humber. It is also present at depth in the Weald and Wessex Basins, as well as offshore. Several of the constituent formations, notably the Taynton Limestone Formation and the Forest Marble Formation are notable for their fossil content, including those of dinosaurs and pterosaurs and some of the earliest mammals.

Paleofauna 
 Cardiodon rugulosus
 Cetiosaurus oxoniensis
 Eoplophysis vetustus (stegosaurid indet)
 Megalosaurus bucklandii
 Proceratosaurus bradleyi
 Seldsienean megistorhynchus

See also 

 List of dinosaur-bearing rock formations
 List of stratigraphic units with few dinosaur genera

References

Bibliography 
 Weishampel, David B.; Dodson, Peter; and Osmólska, Halszka (eds.): The Dinosauria, 2nd, Berkeley: University of California Press. 861 pp. .

Geological groups of the United Kingdom
Jurassic England
Fossils of England
Jurassic System of Europe